Lawrence Aidoo (born 14 January 1982) is a Ghanaian former professional footballer who played as a midfielder.

Career
Aidoo was born in Accra, Ghana. Following stints with Borussia Mönchengladbach, Nürnberg, Energie Cottbus, FSV Frankfurt and Kickers Emden in the top three divisions in Germany, Aidoo ended up playing in the lower leagues.

Aidoo made his debut for the Ghana national team in a friendly against Tunisia on 27 March 2003, and appeared in two African Nations Cup qualifying matches later that year.

References

External links
 
 

Living people
1982 births
Association football midfielders
Ghanaian footballers
Ghana international footballers
King Faisal Babes FC players
Borussia Mönchengladbach players
Borussia Mönchengladbach II players
1. FC Nürnberg players
FC Energie Cottbus players
FSV Frankfurt players
Kickers Emden players
Bundesliga players
2. Bundesliga players
3. Liga players
Expatriate footballers in Germany